Live in Italy is the third installment of the "Official Bootleg" series from the 21st Century Schizoid Band. It is the first album to feature new drummer Ian Wallace, who replaced Michael Giles earlier that year.

Track listing
 "Schizoid Intro" (Jakszyk) 2:00
 "A Man, a City" (Robert Fripp, Greg Lake, McDonald, Giles, Pete Sinfield) 8:36
 "Let There Be Light" (McDonald/Sinfield) 3:26
 "Court of the Crimson King" (McDonald/Sinfield) 7:53
 "Ladies of the Road" (Fripp/Sinfield) 7:10
 "Improv - Sailor's Tale" (Fripp) 11:55
 "Birdman" (McDonald) 4:40
 "Epitaph" (Fripp/Lake/McDonald/Giles/Sinfield) 8:41
 "Catley's Ashes" (Jakszyk) 7:06

The Schizoid Band are
Mel Collins: Baritone, Tenor and Alto Sax, Flute, Keys and Backing Vocals
Peter Giles: Bass Guitar and Backing Vocals
Jakko M. Jakszyk: Guitar, Vocals, Flute and Mellotron
Ian McDonald: Keyboards. Flute, Alto Sax and Vocals
Ian Wallace: Drums, Percussion and Vocal

References

21st Century Schizoid Band albums
2003 live albums